Nagorny (masculine), Nagornaya (feminine), or Nagornoye (neuter) may refer to:
Places in Russia
Nagorny (inhabited locality) (Nagornaya, Nagornoye), name of several inhabited localities in Russia
Nagorny District in Southern Administrative Okrug of Moscow
Nagornaya (Moscow Metro), a station of the Moscow Metro
Nagorny Park in Barnaul, Altai Krai
Trade Union Sport Palace (KRK Nagorny), an ice sports arena in Nizhny Novgorod

Other
Nagorny (surname)

See also
Nahirne (disambiguation) (Nagornoye), one of many villages in Ukraine